Joseph James Henderson (born 2 November 1993) is an English footballer. He is a defender who plays for Southern Football League Division One Central side Daventry Town after being released from Coventry City.

Career
In March 2012, Henderson joined Conference North side Nuneaton Town on a work experience deal until the end of the season. Henderson made his professional debut as a substitute on 27 April 2012 in a 4–0 Championship loss to Southampton, coming on to replace Jordan Willis after 72 minutes. Joe was released from the Sky Blues on 15 May 2013.

On 16 August 2013 Henderson signed for Daventry Town following his release from Coventry City and went on to make 13 appearances in all competitions, scoring one goal.

On 20 December 2013, Henderson joined AFC Rushden & Diamonds.

Career statistics
Stats according to [ Soccerbase]

References

External links
Joe Henderson player profile at ccfc.co.uk

1993 births
Living people
English footballers
Sportspeople from Banbury
Association football defenders
Coventry City F.C. players
Nuneaton Borough F.C. players
Bedworth United F.C. players
Daventry Town F.C. players
AFC Rushden & Diamonds players
English Football League players
Southern Football League players